The National Brewery Centre (formerly the Bass Museum of Brewing and later the Coors Visitor Center) is a museum and tourist attraction adjacent to the Bass Brewery in Burton upon Trent, Staffordshire, England. The centre celebrates the brewing heritage of Burton and features exhibits showcasing the history of brewing techniques. The centre also houses a bar and cafe, a history of the town, a collection of historic vehicles, a micro brewery and a shire horse collection.

Closure, reopening and second closure
On 18 March 2008, Coors announced that it was to close the Visitor Centre which the company was subsidising at a cost of £1 million a year. The museum  closed on 30 June 2008 but the attractions were mothballed in the hope that the museum could be reopened at a later date. A steering group was established to investigate reopening the museum. The museum reopened as the National Brewery Centre on 1 May 2010 and was officially reopened by The Princess Royal on 21 September 2010.

The Centre is due to close on 31 October 2022 after Coors decided to move its UK headquarters to the site. The exhibits are due to be moved to Bass House in Burton.

References

External links 
 The National Brewery Centre website

Museums established in 2010
Museums in Staffordshire
Tourist attractions in Staffordshire
Food museums in the United Kingdom
Beer museums
2010 establishments in England